Vincent Johannes Rudolf Claase, better known under his stage name Vinzzent, is a Dutch singer-songwriter.

Biography
Vinzzent was born in Winterswijk to a Dutch mother and an Indonesian father. He spend his early life growing up in Enschede and The Hague before settling down in Oosterhout. Vinzzent's father organized a lot of events with Pop & Rock bands, giving him a lot of contact with the genres in early life.

Vinzzent followed an education to become a studio technician and began work for several Dutch artists. One of these artists, Rob de Nijs, gave Vinzzent his singing debut during his jubileum concert in Royal Theatre Carré.

Vinzzent fathered one son named Vince Claase.

Career
Vinzzent released his debut album Een zomer lang verliefd in 2007. In 2010 Vinzzent released his most successful single called Dromendans. Dromendans is a cover of Bloubergstrand se sonsak by Kurt Darren. Dromendans ultimately reached 7th place in the Single Top 100.

In 2010 Vinzzent participated in the Dutch National Songfestival to decide who would represent the Netherlands in that year's Eurovision. While Vinzzent received the popular vote, the professional jury did not vote for him. In the end Sieneke was sent instead. Vinzzent did serve as one of the jurors.

Name origin
Vinzzent's pseudonym is an effort by Vincent Claase to sing under his own name, while also being able to be easily found on the World Wide Web. The unique double z in his name makes him easily distinguishable from the other singers with the name Vincent.

References

1978 births
Living people
People from Winterswijk
Dutch male singers